ORG-47241 is a progestin which was under development by Organon for the treatment of "female genital diseases" and as a hormonal contraceptive for the prevention of pregnancy but was never marketed.

References

Abandoned drugs
Drugs with undisclosed chemical structures
Hormonal contraception
Progestogens